Pleuroloma is a genus of flat-backed millipedes in the family Xystodesmidae. There are at least 4 described species in Pleuroloma.

Species
 P. cala (Chamberlin, 1939)
 P. flavipes Rafinesque, 1820
 P. pinicola Shelley, 1980
 P. plana Shelley, 1980

References

Polydesmida